The Three Jewels Temples (삼보사찰| Sambosachal) are the three principal Buddhist temples in Korea, each representing one of the Three Jewels of Buddhism, and all located in South Korea.

Tongdosa in South Gyeongsang Province represents the Buddha; Haeinsa, also in South Gyeongsang Province, represents the dharma or Buddhist teachings; and Songgwangsa in South Jeolla Province represents the sangha or Buddhist community.

In most Korean Buddhist temples, the highest, most important, and often largest building is the Mahavira Hall--the central hall containing statues of the historical Buddha and other important figures.  In the Three Jewel Temples, however, the most important buildings are ones that emphasize each temple's particular jewel.  Thus, the main hall in Tongdosa opens out onto a stupa which the faithful claim contains relics of the Buddha; Haeinsa has two large buildings holding the Tripitaka Koreana; and Songgwangsa has several prominent buildings dedicated to its monastic community (including the numerous Seon (Zen) Masters the temple has produced).

See also
 List of Buddhist temples in Seoul
 Temple Stay

Buddhist pilgrimage sites in South Korea